In Spades is the eighth studio album by American alternative rock band The Afghan Whigs, released on May 5, 2017 on Sub Pop Records.

Reception
The album received mainly positive reviews; according to online review aggregator Metacritic, it has a score of 79%, indicating "generally favorable reviews".

Accolades

Track listing

Personnel
Adapted from Discogs.

The Afghan Whigs
 Greg Dulli – vocals (1-10), guitars (2-6, 8, 10), piano (3, 7-10), mellotron (1, 5), harmonium (1), bass guitar (7), electric piano (7), percussion (3)
 John Curley – bass guitar (2-6, 8-10)
 Rick Nelson – cello (1, 3-5, 10), violin (1, 3-5, 10), viola (1, 4, 5), vocals (1)
 Dave Rosser – guitars (1-6, 8-10), vocals (5, 6)
 Jon Skibic – guitars (1-4, 6-10), mellotron (5)
 Patrick Keeler – drums (2-10)

Additional musicians
 Susan Marshall, vocals (1)
 Ben Ellman – baritone saxophone (3, 4)
 Ian Bowman – tenor saxophone (3)
 John Culbreth – trumpet (3, 4)
 Evan Oberla – trombone (3, 4)
 Petra Haden – violin (7, 9), vocals (9)
 Gabe Noel – cello (7)
 David Ralicke – saxophone (7), trombone (7), trumpet (7)
 Scott Bennett – vocals (9)
 Rob Ingraham – tenor saxophone (4)

Artwork
 Ramon Rodrigues Melo – artwork
 Christopher Friedman – layout

Production
 Rick Nelson – recording engineer
 Christopher Thorn – recording engineer
 Mike Napolitano – recording engineer
 Justin Smith – recording engineer
 Jeff Powell – recording engineer
 Kyle Kelso – recording engineer
 Matt Beck – recording engineer
 Wesley Graham – recording engineer
 Jon Skibic – recording engineer
 Mike Napolitano – mixing
 Christopher Thorn – mixing
 Bernie Grundman – mastering
 Joe Bozzi – mastering

Charts

References

The Afghan Whigs albums
2017 albums
Sub Pop albums
Albums produced by Greg Dulli